Parhypates is a genus of beetles in the family Carabidae, containing the following species:

 Parhypates arctus (Tschitscherine, 1900)
 Parhypates bonellii (G.R.Waterhouse, 1841)
 Parhypates chalybicolor (Chaudoir, 1835)
 Parhypates convexipennis (Fairmaire, 1860)
 Parhypates cordicollis (Dejean, 1828)
 Parhypates extenuatus (Tschitscherine, 1900)
 Parhypates herberti Straneo, 1987
 Parhypates irrequietus (Lutshnik, 1931)
 Parhypates magellanicus (Blanchard, 1843)
 Parhypates melaenus (Chaudoir, 1876)
 Parhypates nunni Straneo, 1987
 Parhypates rufipalpis (Curtis, 1838)
 Parhypates sinuatipennis (Fairmaire, 1860)
 Parhypates stenomus (Chaudoir, 1876)
 Parhypates tenuestriatus Motschulsky, 1866

References

Pterostichinae